is a Japanese actress, singer and gravure idol.

Career
Kitano was born in Kanagawa Prefecture, and is a former member of the celebrity girls futsal team Miss Magazine. In 2005, Kitano won a Miss Magazine Award, becoming the youngest (age 14) to receive that award. In 2007, Kitano was chosen for the first time star in the drama Life. To properly portray her character, Kitano saved up and bought every volume of the manga on which the drama is based. With Kofuku no Shokutaku, she has won 31st Japan Academy Award in the New Actor category. In February 2008, she has also won the 29th Yokohama Film Festival with the same film. After acting in Life and Kofuku no Shokutaku, she was chosen to appear in the promotional video for the single released on October 10, 2007 by Little. Between December 2007 and January 2008, she was chosen as the third cheering manager for Japan's High School Soccer Tournament, following Maki Horikita and Yui Aragaki. She was nominated for Best Supporting Actress Award at Milano Film Festival in 2014 for her impressive portrayal of a music producer's assistant in "The Tenor Lirico Spinto."

Filmography

Dramas
 14 Sai no Haha (2006)
 Junjo Kirari (2006)
 Life (2007)
 Taiyo to Umi no Kyoshitsu (2008)
 Nagareboshi (2010)
 You Kame's Cicada (2010)
 Toilet no Kamisama (2011)
 School  (2011)
 Cleopatra Ladies -Eternal Desire for Beauty (2012)
 Gintama Mitsuba Arc (2017), Mitsuba
 Konuka Ame (2017), Osumi
 Natsuzora (2019)

Movies
 Yubisaki kara Sekai wo (2006)
 Kofuku no Shokutaku (2007) – starring
 Speed Master (2007)
 Spider-Man 3 (2007) – Mary Jane Watson (voice-over for Kirsten Dunst)
 GeGeGe no Kitaro Sennen Noroi Uta (2008) as Kaede Hiramoto
 Love Fight (2008) – starring
 Postman (2008)
 Half Way (2009)
 Pokémon: Arceus and the Jewel of Life – Sheena (voice, 2009)
 Bandage (2010)
 Bushido Sixteen (2010)
 Tokyo Story (2013)
 Jōkyō Monogatari (2013)
 The Tenor Lirico Spinto (2014)
 I Don't Have Many Friends (2014)
 Teacher And Stray Cat (2015)
 Tap The Last Show (2017)
 Sengoku Girl and Kendō Boy (2020)
 Oshorin (TBA)

Photobooks
 First Step (2007)
  (2008)

Promotional videos
 "I Can See Clearly Now" by Beat Crusaders (2005)
 "Pink Candy -the movie-" by Kotaro Oshio (2007)
  by Little (2007)
  by Funky Monkey Babys (2008)

Discography
(All released under Avex Group unless otherwise noted.)

Albums
  (2011-04-13)
 Can You Hear Me? (2012-03-14)

Singles
  (2010-02-24) No. 7, 33,479 copies sold
  (2010-08-11)
  (2011-03-02)
 "Darl:orz" (2012-01-18)

Chakuuta
  (2007.01.27)

References

External links
  
  
  at Avex Group 

1991 births
Living people
People from Yokosuka, Kanagawa
21st-century Japanese actresses
Japanese gravure models
Japanese female models
Japanese women pop singers
Japanese rhythm and blues singers
Avex Group artists
Musicians from Kanagawa Prefecture
21st-century Japanese singers
21st-century Japanese women singers